The age of majority in England is 18, having been reduced from 21 by the Family Law Reform Act 1969. At that age persons are considered as adults and acquire the legal capacity to enter into legally binding contracts (thus to hold a credit card and take out a loan), to vote in elections, to buy tobacco and cigarettes and have a tattoo. Below that age persons are considered in law to be "infants" and colloquially to be "children" or youth.

There are some things a person cannot do at age 18. For example, one must be 21 to adopt a child (unless one is the mother or father of the child).

Capacities at earlier ages

10
At the age of 10, in England, Wales, and Northern Ireland a child is deemed criminally responsible and may be tried in a court of law. The age of criminal responsibility in Scotland is 8 although a child may not be prosecuted in a court until the age of 12.

11
At the age of 11 a child may open a bank current account, but only with permission from a parent. Children up to the age of 11 may be referred to a social worker and a children's hearing.

12
According to a guideline issued by the NSPCC, "children under 12 are rarely mature enough to be left alone for a long period of time".

13
At the age of 13 children may work part-time.

14
At the age of 14 children may enter a public house but may not buy or consume alcoholic drinks.

16
Minors are issued with a National Insurance number by the government. With parental consent they may join the British Army and  get married (not required in Scotland for marriage), and drink wine, beer or cider with a meal in a restaurant. Without parental permission they may work in full-time employment, engage in sexual intercourse, obtain a licence to drive a low-powered motorcycle and open a bank account. The NSPCC suggests 16 as the minimum age for babysitting.

17
At the age of 17 a minor may apply for a driving licence to drive a car.

History
During the medieval era and the era of feudalism, in England the age of majority for males was 21 and for females 14 if married and 16 if single. The attainment of such an age was usually referred to as being "of full age". Thus wardship for males ended at the age of 21, on the obtaining by the ward of a "proof of age" writ, issued after a Proof of age inquisition had obtained evidence from a jury of witnesses. Until that time a ward could be forced to marry a person of the warder's choosing, often his own child, and the resultant progeny would inherit the property formerly subject to the wardship at their father's death, usually regulated by the marriage settlement.

References

Majority (England)
Legal fictions
Adulthood